The Congregation of the Mother of Carmel (C.M.C.) is a Syro-Malabar Catholic centralized religious institute of consecrated life of Pontifical Right for women founded in 1866. It was the first native congregation for women in that church.

History

Foundation  
The congregation was founded as the Sisters of the Third Order of Carmelites Discalced by Kuriakose Elias Chavara, on 13 February 1866 at Koonammavu in the southern state of Kerala.

The first house of the new community was opened in Koonammavu with three women:  Eliswa, a widow, her daughter Anna, Eliswa's sister Tresa and another young lady named Clara came as the fourth member on the next day.. They were given the rules of the Discalced Third Order under the authority of the Roman Catholic Archbishop of Verapoly, Bernardine Baccinelli. Leopold Beccaro was their spiritual director.

Division 
In May 1887, the Holy See established the Syro-Malabar Church in India as independent of the hierarchy of the Latin Church. This caused problems for the young congregation, as both Latin and Syrian bishops claimed authority over them. This had to be settled by Rome, which ruled that the Sisters were part of the Syro-Malabar Vicariate Apostolic of Trichur.

With the eventual reorganization of the Syro-Malabar hierarchy, the Sisters found themselves divided among five different congregations, each under a different bishop and led by its own Superior General. The first foundation outside of Kerala from among the different groups was to the Punjab in 1958.

Union 
Full union of the disparate congregations did not take place until  November 16, 1963, when they were recognized by the Holy See as a congregation of the Eastern Church, at which time the congregation took the name of Congregation of Mother of Carmel, by which it is currently known.

Current
The congregation today is divided among 20 Provinces and six regions throughout India and Africa. They also serve in Germany, Italy and the United States.

Saints of the congregation
Elias Chavara was beatified by Pope John Paul II in 1986, along with Alphonsa of the Immaculate Conception in the course of his visit to India. One of the congregation's early members, Euphrasia of the Sacred Heart of Jesus, was beatified by Pope Benedict XVI in 2006. Chavara and Euphrasia were canonised by Pope Francis on 24 November 2014.

Mary Celine Payyappilly, the first Superior General of the united C.M.C. congregation was declared as Servant of God by George Alencherry, Major Archbishop of the Syro-Malabar Catholic Church on 9 April 2018.

References

Eastern Catholic orders and societies
Syro-Malabar Catholic Church
Discalced Carmelite Order
Religious organizations established in 1866
1866 establishments in India